Dolenje Jezero is a village on the northern edge of Lake Cerknica in the Municipality of Cerknica in the Inner Carniola region of Slovenia.

Name
The name Dolenje Jezero means 'lower lake' and is a semantic contrast to the neighboring village of Gorenje Jezero (literally, 'upper lake'), which stands about  higher in elevation. Like other villages named Jezero, the name refers to a local landscape element—in this case, Lake Cerknica.

Church
The local church in the southwest part of the settlement is dedicated to Saints Peter and Paul and belongs to the Parish of Cerknica.

Gallery

References

External links 

Dolenje Jezero on Geopedia

Populated places in the Municipality of Cerknica